Knight Rider (ナイトライダー Naito Raidā) is a racing video game for the Nintendo Entertainment System that is very loosely based on the television show of the same name.

Gameplay
The gameplay is simple: There are fifteen cities that are featured, starting with a drive from Los Angeles to San Francisco and ending back in Los Angeles. KITT can be upgraded with more fuel and shield capacities. It can also have its top speed upgraded, and how many lasers/missiles it starts with. In the first six missions, there are allies, represented by Knight trucks who will give a powerup to the player.

Mission mode
Terrorists have raided a U.S. military site; only a man and his robotic car can chase them across the United States to stop their evil plan. A time limit helps put pressure on the player as he attempts to defeat the terrorist forces. There are three types of vehicles in this mode: Red (enemies), blue (civilians) and yellow (enemies who carry powerups). KITT has structural shielding; however the vehicle is considered destroyed if it repeatedly crashes or enemy gunfire depletes the shielding. Despite the non-violent premise of the television show, "Mission Mode" makes use of firearms as way to enhance play, similar to RoadBlasters. Shooting non-combatant (blue) vehicles deducts from the timer, making the completion of a level more difficult. After every third level, Devon will offer the player a password that can be used to resume the journey from that point.

Drive mode
There is also a drive mode that allows players to go on a simple drive through the game's stages without weapons or enemy fire.

Music
The game pointedly does not include the iconic theme from the Knight Rider television show.

See also

 Knight Rider franchise

References

1988 video games
Acclaim Entertainment games
Knight Rider video games
Nintendo Entertainment System games
Nintendo Entertainment System-only games
Pack-In-Video games
Single-player video games
Video games set in the 1980s
Video games set in Toronto
Video games set in Canada
Video games set in the United States
Video games set in San Francisco
Video games set in Seattle
Video games set in Utah
Video games set in Colorado
Video games set in St. Louis
Video games set in Chicago
Video games set in Boston
Video games set in New York City
Video games set in Washington, D.C.
Video games set in Miami
Video games set in Texas
Video games set in Arizona
Video games set in Nevada
Video games set in Los Angeles
Video games developed in Japan